The 2017–18 Tunisian Cup (Coupe de Tunisie) was the 86th season of the football cup competition of Tunisia.
The competition is organized by the Fédération Tunisienne de Football (FTF) and open to all clubs in Tunisia.

Preliminary rounds
Results:

Round of 32
The draw for the round of 32 and round of 16 was held on 13 December 2017.

Round of 16

Quarter-finals

Semi-finals
The games were played on 22 April 2018.

Final
The final match was played on 13 May.

See also
2017–18 Tunisian Ligue Professionnelle 1
2017–18 Tunisian Ligue Professionnelle 2

References

Tunisian Cup
Tunisia